Cape Fear Baptist Church is a historic Baptist church near Hope Mills in Grays Creek Township, Cumberland County, North Carolina.

Cape Fear Baptist Church is on Butler Nursery Road in rural Cumberland County, North Carolina. The church was established in 1756 as Particular Baptist Church. The current sanctuary was constructed in 1859. It is a two-story frame gable-roof building with a monumental Greek Revival style two-story pedimented front portico.

It was listed on the National Register of Historic Places in 1983.

References

Baptist churches in North Carolina
Churches on the National Register of Historic Places in North Carolina
Greek Revival church buildings in North Carolina
Churches completed in 1859
19th-century Baptist churches in the United States
Churches in Cumberland County, North Carolina
National Register of Historic Places in Cumberland County, North Carolina
Wooden churches in North Carolina